Vanden High School is a high school in Fairfield, California. It is in the Travis Unified School District and serves children from southern Vacaville, eastern Fairfield, and Travis Air Force Base. This school serves grades 9-12. The mascot of VHS is a Viking.

Athletics 
The following sports are offered at Vanden:
Baseball
Basketball
Bocce Ball
Cheerleading
Cross-country running
Curling
Football
Shuffleboard
Soccer
Softball
Tennis
Track and field
Volleyball
Wrestling

References

External links
School website

Fairfield, California
Public high schools in California
High schools in Solano County, California